San Bernardino District is one of four districts of the province San Pablo in Peru.

References

pt:San Bernardino (distrito)